The 12th Open Russian Festival of Animated Film was held from March 1–5, 2007, in Suzdal, Russia.  The winners for the main award categories were announced on March 4.  The jury consisted of 33 professionals in professions related to animation.  The Encyclopedia of Domestic Animation, the first attempt to cover the full history of Russian and Soviet animation, was premiered at the festival.

Main awards

Other prizes

Jury rating
Each jury member was asked to list their top five films of the festival.  Five points were given for a 1st place vote and so on, down to one point for a 5th place vote.

External links
Official website with the results
Breakdown of jury votes
Breakdown of jury votes (categories)
2007 entries on Rambler Vision (46 out of the total 61 can be viewed, though some only partially)

Anim
Open Russian Festival of Animated Film
2007 film festivals
2007 festivals in Asia
2007 festivals in Europe
2007 in animation